Turki bin Abdul Mohsen bin Abdul Latif Al Al-Sheikh (born August 4, 1981), is a Saudi adviser at the Royal Court under the rank of Minister and the current Chairman of General Authority for Entertainment.

Education and career 
Al-Sheikh graduated from King Fahad Security College in 2001 with a bachelor's degree in Security Sciences. He then worked in several government sectors including the Interior Ministry, the Emirate of Riyadh and the office of the Defense Minister and the Crown Prince. He was appointed an adviser to the royal court in 2015 and later, in 2017, he was promoted to be a royal advisor with the rank of minister.

In September 2017, a royal decree was issued to appoint him as the new chairman of the General Sports Authority. In December 2018, he was appointed as chairman of the General Authority for Entertainment.

Sport 
Al-Sheikh is Chairman of the Islamic Solidarity Sports Federation (ISSF), and previously Honorary President of Al-Taawoun in Buraidah. He used to be the owner of the Egyptian club Pyramids FC from 2018 to 2019. On 2 August 2019, he became the owner of UD Almería, replacing Alfonso García Gabarrón. He named Mohamed El Assy as general director of the club. In December 2020, Al-Sheikh became the honorary president of the Sudanese club Al-Hilal.

Personal 
In addition to his official and honorary career, Turki Al-Sheikh was known for his artistic writing, and his lyrics were enriched by a number of Arab artists. He was married to Egyptian singer Amal Maher, who is now rumoured to have been missing for months; with more rumours alleging that Al-Sheikh has kept her in a detention centre to slowly and brutally torture her, so as to punish Maher for filing a lawsuit of assault against him. 
 

The story started an outrage on Egyptian social media following the brutal murder of a Mansoura University student, Naira Ashraf, after which a picture of Maher was posted on her Facebook account, with a suspicious slew of news outlets began citing it as proof that Maher is living her life normally. However, many are alleging this is an old picture, and that the records will only be set straight if Maher appears on live video, which she still has not.

Criticism 
Madawi al-Rasheed noted about Sheikh: "Sheikh is revealing himself to be much like the other coterie of aides that the crown prince has ushered in to lead his many new initiatives"[...] "We now have Sheikh, mixing entertainment with the vulgarity of the new Saudi nationalism. His portfolio is to entertain Saudis, but he is doing it with bad taste, excessive hype and populist propaganda."

Awards 

 The most influential Arab sports personality of the year 2017 at the 12th Dubai International Sports Conference.
 The Arab Sports Personality Award in Mohammed bin Rashid Award of the year 2018.
 The Arab Sport Culture Award of 2017.

References

1981 births
Living people
21st-century Saudi Arabian poets
Saudi Arabian military personnel